Tails Adventure is a platform game developed by Aspect and published by Sega in 1995 for the Game Gear. The game stars Tails from the Sonic the Hedgehog series in a solo adventure, as he collects an array of items to help him explore Cocoa Island and defeat the enemies inhabiting it. The gameplay is more slow-paced than other Sonic games, with Tails only capable of walking and flying at a moderate speed. The stages are explored in a non-linear fashion, with newly collected items opening up pathways in previous areas.

Along with Tails' Skypatrol, the game is one of two on the Game Gear to star Tails in a solo role. Tails Adventure received mixed reviews, with critics finding the game unoriginal and too slow-paced compared to previous Sonic offerings. Retrospective reviews commended the game for trying something different and compared the gameplay to the Metroid series, but disliked what they felt was repetitive backtracking. Tails Adventure was included in Sonic Adventure DX (2003), Sonic Gems Collection (2005), and re-released on the Nintendo 3DS in 2013.

Gameplay

Contrary to the classic speedy gameplay in the Sonic the Hedgehog series, Tails Adventure is a slow-paced platformer with an emphasis on exploration. The player controls Tails in a story set before he befriended Sonic, as he adventures to save Cocoa Island from an invasion of the Kukku Army. He cannot run, but only walk at a steady pace. The player explores twelve non-linear stages, collecting new items and abilities to open up new path ways in previous stages. A total of 26 items can be collected, including some to defeat enemies and others to aid in exploration. Along with using items, Tails can fly for a short period of time. His fly duration can be extended by locating Chaos Emeralds. Rings are collected as a form of health, and unlike other Sonic games, only a few rings are lost when touching a hazard. This gameplay has been compared to Metroidvania games.

Tails finds several different kinds of gadgets on his adventures. Some of these items are weapons used to defeat enemies, like bombs and hammers. Some items aid in exploration, such as a small robot which Tails can control to scout ahead and squeeze into tight spaces. Tails can only carry four tools when entering a stage. Only one item can be equipped at a time, the player must pause the game to change items. If the player finds that they cannot advance because they require another item, they must find a stage exit, swap items, and re-enter the stage from the beginning.

Development and release 
Tails Adventure was developed for the Game Gear by Aspect and published by Sega. Along with Tails Skypatrol, it is one of two Sonic the Hedgehog games on the Game Gear to star Tails. The soundtrack was composed by Koijro Mikusa, who also wrote music for Sonic Blast. Tails Adventure was released for the Game Gear on September 22, 1995, in Japan. It was released in Europe in October, and in North America in November. The game was first re-released through Sonic Adventure DX in 2003 as an unlockable bonus game, and later in the Sonic Gems Collection compilation in 2005. It was also re-released on the Nintendo 3DS via the eShop worldwide in 2013 along with several other Sonic games for the Game Gear.

Reception 

Critics felt Tails Adventure was too similar to other platform games, and its slow pace made it weaker than other Sonic offerings. Famitsu felt it lacked any surprising elements and was disappointed it was much more standard than other Sonic games. Mean Machines Sega agreed, calling it "decidedly unoriginal", but believed secret areas and a steep learning curve made it interesting enough to continue playing. Electronic Gaming Monthly compared the game to Super Mario platforming titles and also enjoyed finding hidden areas. Critics generally liked the graphics and controls, however the graphics did receive some criticism. Mean Machines Sega felt some of the background textures repeated too much, Famitsu criticized the screen's narrow field of vision, and Electronic Gaming Monthly noted some screen blur issues.

In retrospective reviews, both Nintendo World Report and Nintendo Life felt the game was a significant contrast to the other Sonic Game Gear games. They believed the game exchanged the speed of previous series installments for exploratory gameplay more akin to the Metroid series and Gargoyle's Quest (1990). USgamer recommended the game, calling it a departure from the Sonic series, and the closest a Sonic game ever felt to a Nintendo franchise. Nintendo Life enjoyed the variety of gadgets and level designs, but criticized the dark environments and repeating background textures. Along with Nintendo World Report, they criticized the game's poor handling of inventory. The journalists would often explore large portions of a level only to learn they were missing a necessary item, and would need to restart the stage. The game's presence in Sonic Gems Collection was welcomed as a modern convenience, but was criticized along with other Game Gear inclusions for graphical glitches and poor emulation. Some felt the portable games were merely supplemental to the more substantial games in the collection and dismissed them. 1UP.com perceived Tails Adventure and Tails Skypatrol's inclusion in the compilation as Sega "scraping the bottom of the barrel," describing them as "nigh-unplayable portable titles from an era best forgotten."

Notes

References

Aspect Co. games
Metroidvania games
Platform games
Game Gear games
Game Gear-only games
Sega video games
Video game prequels
Virtual Console games
Video games about birds
Video games about children
Video games about foxes
Video games set in Oceania
1995 video games
Single-player video games
Sonic the Hedgehog spin-off games
Virtual Console games for Nintendo 3DS
Video games developed in Japan